Count Jan Nepomucen Potocki (1867–1943) was a Polish nobleman (szlachcic).

Jan was owner of Rymanów Zdrój estates. He was married to Róża Maria Wodzicka on 30 June 1892 in Kraków, and to Maria Szajer on 14 October 1905 in Przemyśl.

Potocka, Jan Nepomucen
Potocka, Jan Nepomucen
Potocka, Jan Nepomucen
Jan Nepomucen Potocki